Jamie Kimmel (born March 28, 1962) is a former American football linebacker. He played for the Los Angeles Raiders from 1986 to 1987.

References

1962 births
Living people
American football linebackers
Syracuse Orange football players
Los Angeles Raiders players